Kingston Council may be:

Kingston upon Thames London Borough Council
Kingston Council, BSA